Clifford Ivory (born August 1, 1975) is a former cornerback in the Canadian Football League with the Hamilton Tiger-Cats and the Toronto Argonauts. He once shared the Argonauts' record for most interceptions returned for touchdowns with 5 along with Ed Berry and Adrion Smith, before Byron Parker broke the record with his 6th interception return for a touchdown in 2007.

References

External links
 Toronto Argonauts bio

1975 births
Living people
American players of Canadian football
Canadian football defensive backs
Hamilton Tiger-Cats players
People from Thomasville, Georgia
Scottish Claymores players
Toronto Argonauts players
Troy Trojans football players
African-American players of Canadian football
People from Quitman, Georgia
21st-century African-American sportspeople
20th-century African-American sportspeople